Trumaine "Joe" Sykes (born November 22, 1982) is a professional American football defensive end who is currently a free agent. He was originally signed by the Washington Redskins as an undrafted free agent in 2006. He played college football at Southern University.

Sykes has also played for the Green Bay Blizzard and the Saskatchewan Roughriders.

Early life
Sykes attended Grenada High School in Grenada, Mississippi. Sykes was a member of the basketball and football teams while at Grenada.

College career

Holmes C.C.
Sykes began his college career at Holmes Community College in Mississippi. Sykes played two years at Holmes, becoming an NJCAA All-American.

Sykes committed to West Virginia University on July 8, 2003. Sykes chose West Virginia over football scholarship offers from Auburn, Louisiana Tech, Memphis, Ole Miss, Mississippi State, Southern Miss & Temple.

West Virginia
Sykes enrolled at West Virginia in January so he could familiarize himself with the playbook. Sykes appeared in 9 games in 2004, recording 4 tackles with 1.0 sack.

Southern
His senior year of college, Sykes transferred to Southern University. In his one year with the Jaguars, Sykes was named first team All-SWAC, after leading the conference in sacks with 9.

Professional career

Return to San Jose
On January 27, 2014, Sykes was traded back to the SaberCats in exchange for Mitch Mustain and Jabari Fletcher.

Pittsburgh Power
On September 25, 2014, Sykes was assigned to the Pittsburgh Power. The Power folded in November 2014.

Jacksonville Sharks
On January 12, 2015, Sykes was assigned to the Jacksonville Sharks. Following the seasons end, Sykes was named the Defensive Lineman of the Year for the third time in his career. Sykes was also named the Defensive Player of the Year for the second time in his career.

Monterrey Steel
On March 24, 2017, Sykes signed with the Monterrey Steel of the National Arena League.

Albany Empire
On March 19, 2018, Sykes was assigned to the Albany Empire. On July 18, 2018, Sykes was named the AFL's Defensive Lineman of the Year for the 4th time.

References

External links
Southern Jaguars bio
West Virginia Mountaineers bio
Saskatchewan Roughriders bio

1982 births
Living people
American football defensive linemen
Canadian football defensive linemen
People from Grenada, Mississippi
Holmes Bulldogs football players
West Virginia Mountaineers football players
Southern Jaguars football players
Washington Redskins players
Green Bay Blizzard players
Saskatchewan Roughriders players
Edmonton Elks players
Milwaukee Iron players
San Jose SaberCats players
Sacramento Mountain Lions players
San Antonio Talons players
Pittsburgh Power players
Jacksonville Sharks players
Monterrey Steel players
Albany Empire (AFL) players